The International Society for Mathematical Sciences is a mathematics society, primarily based in Japan. It was formerly known as the Japanese Association of Mathematical Sciences, and was founded in 1948 by Tatsujiro Shimizu.

The ISMS publishes a bimonthly scientific journal, Scientiae Mathematicae Japonicae, which was formed in 2001 from the merger of two journals previously published by the same society, Mathematica Japonica, founded in 1948, and Scientiae Mathematicae, which published nine issues over three volumes in 1998, 1999, and 2000. In addition the ISMS holds an annual meeting and publishes a Japanese language mathematics magazine, Kaiho, and a monthly newsletter, Notices from the ISMS.

References

External links
 International Society for Mathematical Sciences

Mathematical societies